Hjørungavåg is a village in Hareid Municipality in Møre og Romsdal county, Norway. The village is located on the eastern shore of the island of Hareidlandet, just southeast of the municipal centre of Hareid.

The area was historically known as Liavåg. Due to the fact that the historic Battle of Hjörungavágr in 986 may have been fought in the vicinity of the village, the village was renamed Hjørungavåg in 1897. The village celebrated the 1000-year anniversary of the battle in 1986.

References

Hareid
Villages in Møre og Romsdal